The Juno Award for "Pop Album of the Year" has been awarded since 1999, as recognition each year for the best pop album in Canada.
The category was first named as Best Pop Album but it changed to Best Pop/Adult Album in 2000, the following year it returned to be Best Pop Album from 2001 to 2002, finally in 2003 was changed to Pop Album of the Year and has remained that way since then. Justin Bieber has won the most awards in this category, with 3 wins.

Recipients

References 

Pop Album
Pop music awards
Awards established in 1999
1999 establishments in Canada
Album awards